The 14th Senate District of Wisconsin is one of 33 districts in the Wisconsin State Senate.  Located in central Wisconsin, the district comprises Green Lake and Marquette counties, and most of Columbia and Waupaca counties, as well as the southern half of Adams County, the eastern half of Waushara County, northwest Dodge County, western Fond du Lac County, and parts of northeast Sauk County and western Outagamie County.

Current elected officials
Joan Ballweg is the senator representing the 14th district.  She was first elected in the 2020 general election. Before serving as a senator, she was a member of the State Assembly from 2015 to 2021.

Each Wisconsin State Senate district is composed of three Wisconsin State Assembly districts.  The 14th Senate district comprises the 40th, 41st, and 42nd Assembly districts.  The current representatives of those districts are:  
 Assembly District 40: Kevin David Petersen (R–Waupaca)
 Assembly District 41: Alex Dallman (R–Green Lake)
 Assembly District 42: Jon Plumer (R–Lodi)

The 14th Senate district crosses five congressional districts.  The portion of the district within Waupaca and Outagamie counties falls within Wisconsin's 8th congressional district, which is represented by U.S. Representative Mike Gallagher; the portion of the district in Adams County is within Wisconsin's 3rd congressional district, represented by U.S. Representative Ron Kind; the portions of the district in Dane and Sauk counties are within Wisconsin's 2nd congressional district, represented by U.S. Representative Mark Pocan; the counties of Columbia, Waushara, Green Lake, and Marquette, as well as the northern part of Dodge County are within Wisconsin's 6th congressional district, represented by U.S. Representative Glenn Grothman; the last piece of the district, the town of Calamus, in Dodge County, falls within Wisconsin's 5th congressional district, represented by Scott L. Fitzgerald.

Past senators
Previous senators include:

Note: the boundaries of districts have changed repeatedly over history. Previous politicians of a specific numbered district have represented a completely different geographic area, due to redistricting.

Notes

References

External links
District Website
Senator Olsen's website

Wisconsin State Senate districts
Adams County, Wisconsin
Columbia County, Wisconsin
Fond du Lac County, Wisconsin
Green Lake County, Wisconsin
Marquette County, Wisconsin
Outagamie County, Wisconsin
Waupaca County, Wisconsin
Waushara County, Wisconsin
1848 establishments in Wisconsin